Pandit Divyang Vakil (commonly addressed as Guruji or 'respected teacher') is a Tabla and Rhythm maestro renowned globally for his intricate rhythm compositions; a Guru of Taalvidya'; Spirituality and Philosophy.

About

Musical career 
Pandit Divyang Vakil received formal training in Indian classical percussion instrument Tabla under the tutelage of not one but three Gurus from different Gharanas; Pandit Sudhirkumar Saxena of the Ajrada gharana, Ustad Latif Ahmed Khan of the Delhi gharana and Ustad Allarakha Khan of the Punjab gharana. Pandit Vakil has also accompanied many of the great masters of Indian classical music including Pt. Nikhil Banerjee and Pt. Maniramji.

Nearly 30 years ago, Pandit Divyang Vakil renounced his career as a tabla performer to dedicate himself wholeheartedly to teaching, composing and spiritual pursuits.

Tabla Guru 
In 2019, Pandit Divyang Vakil (affectionately known as 'Guruji' to his students) completed his 40th year of teaching Tabla. He has taught thousands of students and produced innumerable professionals globally through his expansive teaching career spanning over 4 decades. He is the founder of Rhythm Riders Music Institute in Ahmedabad, Gujarat.  An affiliated institute of Rhythm Riders Music Institute is the Taalim School of Indian Music in the US, which is run by American disciples of Pandit Divyang Vakil. His students have also established Tabla schools in places such as Australia, Korea, UK and various locations across the US.

Taalvidya Guru 
Guruji Pandit Divyang Vakil is currently providing extensive rhythm training to over 500 Kathak students, dancers, artists, teachers and professionals globally who are being trained in Indian classical dance form Kathak from different Kathak Gurus; institutes and belong to different Gharanas (schools of Indian classical dance and music) of Kathak dance. The Taalvidya' program focuses on the rhythmic aspect of Kathak and aims at providing the dancers with a deeper understanding into the fundamental structure of the art form through classes, workshops and courses eventually opening up many new avenues for an artist to explore. Kathak dancers from around the world often dance to his Kathak compositions. During the pandemic, his vision connected numerous Kathak dancers, artists and teachers from India and abroad in a collaborative spirit and who choreographed and danced upon many of his original and memorable Kathak compositions produced digitally by Aaditaal Music Project; the production face of Indian music composer, producer and artist Rushi Vakil and released under the title of 'Quarantine Kathak Connections'.

 Guru of Spirituality and philosophy Guruji Pandit Divyang Vakil has conducted intensive research for the past 2 decades on one of the vastly ignored subjects by mankind i.e.,'Death'; '''The art of dying' which includes understanding of different philosophies and concepts, and scientific aspects revolving around the subject of 'Death' as well as death rituals and customs in practice across various religions in the world. For research alone, he has travelled across numerous countries and closely examined many events of death to gain deeper insights into the mystery, origin and progression of life towards a distinguished state of 'Death' and the phenomenon of death itself'. By combining his vast knowledge and experience as a rhythm maestro, his keen interest in philosophy and profound spiritual experience, his research involves in- depth understanding and deciphering the vibrations and rhythmic patterns associated with 'death'. Guruji has delivered many lectures on the 'Philosophy of Death' until now and he shares his experiences upon this subject with doctors and his students as well. He has also conducted various discourses and has delivered numerous lectures globally on topics such as 'Philosophy of Music', 'Philosophy of Death and Reincarnation', 'Human behaviour', 'Hanuman Chalisa' and more.

 Composer 
As a composer, Guruji Pandit Divyang Vakil is known for his intricate rhythm compositions. He has been teaching the concepts of rhythm and guiding numerous musicians and drummers globally to adapt the fundamentals of the Indian classical rhythm system onto their own instrument creating new rhythmic structures while demonstrating the universality of rhythm. In 2011, he collaborated with South Korean musician Yu Kyung-hwa. Vakil composed a piece for Yu to play on the traditional Korean instrument, the Janggu, and set it to popular Indian rhythms. The piece debuted in February 2011 at Rhythm Riders Music Institute in Ahmedabad, India. The following month Pandit Ji was invited to compose and teach Indian rhythms and theory to Korean artists in an international music exchange program.

Pandit Divyang Vakil is well known for his contemporary classical Tabla ensemble compositions 'Tabla Triveni', 'Tabla Taandav', 'Tabla Tarkhat' and Tālavya' to name a few.  Through his compositions, Pandit Vakil has given a modern form to Indian classical Tabla playing.

 Tālavya 
Formerly known as the Tabla Ecstasy, Talavya is a contemporary Indian Classical Percussion Ensemble that explores the capabilities of expressing the Indian Classical Hand Drum Tabla as a rhythmic as well as a melodic instrument. The ensemble performs compositions by Guruji Pandit Divyang Vakil. Tabla Ecstasy, Power of Tabla, Ardha Taal Chakravyuha are a few of his full length instrumental ensemble pieces which are essentially contemporary compositions by Guruji Pt. Divyang Vakil that Talavya performs. In 2007, his tabla duet called Power of Tabla was the first musical performance by Gujarati artists to be performed in the history of IIM-Ahmedabad Chaos Festival. One of his most difficult works is Ardha Taal Chakra (literally meaning "circle of half rhythms").  Ardha Taal Chakra explored half-beat Indian rhythm cycles. Created in 2006, it was recomposed and renamed in 2010 to become Ardha Taal Chakravyuha. All the group Tabla works retain the essence of the Indian Classical Music while showcasing synchronization of complex rhythms transitioning to smooth meditative passages not usually associated with drumming. Talavya has also performed at notable events and locations such as the Chico World Music Festival, held in Chico, California, United States, Symphony Space, NYC, TEDx ASB Events at Mumbai, India, The INK Conference at Jaipur, India, Queens University of Charlotte, USA, Lincoln Center, NYC, The Percussive Arts Society International Convention (PASIC™) 2013 at Indianapolis, USA and numerous other locations across North America. Talavya has collaborated with American percussionist and musician Mickey Hart, Canadian vocalist Shakura S’Aida, musician Sidi Touré and Cuban Fire.

 Pradhanica 

Pandit Divyang Vakil's latest work Pradhanica; meaning 'Female leader ’ or 'Female head' is a collaborative stage production between the South Korean origin Kathak dancer, choreographer and Guruji Pandit Divyang Vakil's Tabla disciple Jin Won. Pradhanica is a 90-minute ensemble of World Drums and Indian classical dance form Kathak showcasing the contemporary side of the dance composed by Guruji Pandit Divyang and led by Jin Won . It essentially explores the possibilities of expressing emotions through rhythm and movement. The ensemble includes Pandit Divyang Vakil's disciple Mike Lukshis playing the Indian classical hand percussion instrument 'Tabla' along with Kaumil Shah on African Djembe, Vincent Pierce on the Latin American instrument Cajon and Indrajit Roy Choudhary on Indian classical string instrument Sitar. Pradhanica has performed at various locations across the states; Manhattan Movement and Art Center, Drive East, The Festival of South Asian Music and Dance at La MaMa, Lone Tree Arts Center, Colorado, Musikfest in Bethlehem, PA, and Annual Princeton Festival at McCarter Theater in Princeton are some to mention. 

 Events 

 Gurupoornima Celebration 
Gurupoornima 2019 July 2019

 Legacy concert 
The Legacy concert, 2019 celebrated Guruji'' Pandit Divyang Vakil's 40th teaching anniversary. The concert featured numerous performances by his senior 'Tabla' disciples, artists and students of 'Rhythm' performing on western Drum kit, Janggu and more; as well as his 'Taalvidya' students, dancers and professionals from the field of 'Kathak' from around the world. The event also showcased a performance by the notable American drummer Will Calhoun who has been inspired by Guruji's rhythmic styles as well as Korean percussionist Prof. Kyung- Hwa You, who adapted the aspects of Indian rhythm and music in her playing of the traditional Korean instrument Janggu.

Rhythmic Freefall 
Rhythmic Freefall: The Power of Rhythm in Nature' was an event curated by the Taalim School of Indian Music held at the base of the Lower Enfield Falls at Robert H. Treman State Park on 22 September 2018. Reportedly, over 100 Tabla players aged 4 – 65 years from the Taalim School of Indian Music, USA led by Guruji Pandit Divyang Vakil showcased a powerful performance alongside the rushing waterfall to experience the oneness of rhythm in nature. The event marked the 20th anniversary of a similar event conceptualised by Guruji Pandit Divyang Vakil 20 years before in Gujarat, India at the Zanzari waterfall.

Awards
Pandit Divyang Vakil received the 'Gujarat Gaurav Puraskar' (Gujarat State honour) by the Gujarat Rajya Sangeet Natak Academy on 8 December 2014 for his years of contribution to the field of Indian classical music in an award ceremony held at the Gujarati Sahitya Parishad Hall.

External links 

 Taalim School of Indian Music
 https://rushivakil.com/

References 

Living people
Hindustani instrumentalists
Spiritual teachers
Indian drummers
Tabla players
Indian music educators
Indian percussionists
Year of birth missing (living people)
21st-century philosophers